Zgharta, also spelled Zghorta, is a city in North Lebanon, with an estimated population of around 50,000. It is the second biggest city in Northern Lebanon after Tripoli.

Zgharta is about 150 metres above sea level and lies between the rivers of Jouit and Rashein. It is 23 kilometres from Ehden, 11 kilometres from the coastal city of Tripoli, 88.7 kilometres from the capital of Lebanon, Beirut, and 82 kilometres from the nearest Syrian city, Tartous. Its history and people are closely associated with the village of Ehden. Most of the citizens of Zgharta have summer houses in Ehden.

It is the seat and the capital of the Zgharta District (Qadaa' Zgharta). Zgharta is closely related to the mountain town of Ehden, essentially sharing the same population. Each summer, most of the people in Zgharta move to spend their summer in Ehden; this is reversed in winter when Ehden is practically deserted. Zghartawis speak the Lebanese dialect with a distinctive accent, the original Syriac accent applied on Arabic language. Syriac was taught in local schools till the mid 1900s.

Zgharta had two Presidents of Lebanon: Suleiman Frangieh and René Moawad, and many prominent politicians: Youssef Salim Karam, Hamid Frangieh, Semaan El Douaihy, Suleiman Frangieh Jr, Nayla Moawad, Estephan El Douaihy (ex-MP), Salim Bey Karam, Tony Frangieh (current MP), Jawad Boulos, Michel Moawad (current MP) and Youssef Bahha El Douaihy. Ehden also produced at least four patriarchs of the Maronite Church – Gregorios Of Ehden, David Of Ehden, Jeremiah of Amshit (1199-1230), Youhanna Makhlouf (1609-1633), George Omaira (1634-1644), Estephan El Douaihy (1670-1704) – and an Ottoman era nationalist leader Youssef Bey Karam who led a rebellion against Turkish rule. Political power in Zgharta district is dominated by a few rival families from the town: the Karam, Frangieh, Douaihy, Moawad and Makary.

Traditionally, agriculture was a large portion of the local economy, with olives grown for olive-oil around Zgharta and apple orchards around Ehden. Recently, the service (especially tourism and leisure) and manufacturing sectors have seen significant growth.

Etymology

Various explanations have been given as to the meaning of Zgharta. The majority are of the opinion that it relates to meanings relating to fortresses, citadels, barricades and the like. One writer has suggested that it derived from the Aramaic word "zaghar" meaning fortress. They also have been saying that Zgharta was named by Youssef Bey Karam, who chose that name with the meaning of a little version of Ehden (the expression "zaghar Ehden" explains it).

History

Ancient history
The Plain of Zgharta around Zgharta was likely inhabited from at least the beginning of the Neolithic Revolution by the Qaraoun culture as evidenced by some large, heavy Neolithic flints and double-headed axes found in the area that are documented by R. Wetzel and J. Haller in 1945.

There is some evidence that the area of Zgharta was later inhabited in 200 BC and that in the 2nd and 3rd centuries there were already fortifications. Its present-day existence and its close association with the village of Ehden began in the 16th century.

The founding of modern Zgharta

The story of that beginning is recorded in a manuscript in the Syriac language, which belonged to Romanos Afandi Yammine, son of Father George Yammine, and is now held by his grandson Youssef Boutros Romanos Yammine. It describes how people of Ehden had acquired "the farmland of Zgharta":

On the eve of the 24th of January 1515, Al-Ghazali, the governor of Damascus, along with Sinan Pasha, the minister of Sultan Selim I, had reached Ehden travelling along the route of Damascus-Bekaa Valley-Dahr al-Kadib-the cedars. They were transporting funds to Sultan Salim I who was in Egypt. They were welcomed as guests by Sheikh Iskandar, whilst other members of their travelling entourage were guests of the people of Ehden. Heavy snowfall and extremely freezing conditions that lasted two full days prompted them to stay five days in Ehden where Sheikh Iskandar and Bishop Keryakos Douaihy, the local bishop, provided for their guests great hospitality, generosity and kindness. Responding to a request by their guests, the people of Ehden endeavoured to clear the heavy snow off the road as far as Hayrouna Valley overlooking the coast, accompanying their guests to safety where they made their farewells to them with fitting accolades.

In April 1516, Bishop El Douaihy and Sheikh Iskandar received a letter from Al-Ghazali, saying on being told by his minister, Sinan Pasha of their and peoples hospitality and assistance, Sultan Salim I asked that he rewarded them which he promised the Sultan he would. On his return to Damascus, Al-Ghazali invited the people of Ehden to meet him in Tripoli.  At the request of Sheikh Iskander he agreed to provide the people with a place to live away from the harsh winter conditions, which they faced in Ehden. Al-Ghazali readily agreed to this request. Accompanied by his officials, Sheikh Iskandar went with Bishop El Douaihy to choose a suitable place in the Al-Zawiyi region. They chose a derelict farm, containing a few demolished houses and a tower in the middle, situated between the rivers Joueit and Rashein. Al-Ghazali, on the return of his officials with the measurements of the site, promised to obtain a "Shahani firman" (decree) from Sultan Salim whereby ownership of the land would pass to the people of Ehden.

Some eight months later, in 1517, the "Shahani firman" was granted, but it was addressed to Sheikh Iskandar. Having collected the firman in Damascus and returning to Ehden the people there were aggrieved that the firman was addressed solely to Sheikh Iskandar, fearing that he and his relations could claim sole ownership. Bishop El Douaihy, representing the people, put this to Sheikh Iskandar and as a result he declared at the Mar Mama church that the given land known as "Zgharta would be distributed equally between the people of Ehden".

Later history

In 1602, Father Ghodar, a Jesuit priest to Zgharta recorded:
"Zgharta represents a horrific nightmare for its enemy. Its youth is dressed in traditional clothing; white shirts decorated with yellow stitched embroidery, strongly tied "sherwal" pants along with long boots and topped by headband reflecting enormous heroism. Zgharta is a small village surrounded by an enclosure, and has a fortress beside the church of Virgin Mary. Zgharta used to be a drawn line between danger and worship, situated between Tripoli and the mountain. It would receive initial attacking strikes, then reply by returning those strikes, hitting the hearts of their enemy. Its people have therefore been renowned and recognised as excellent fighters"

Another later visitor in 1831 records that "From Tripoli I left for Zgharta, which is two hours away. Its land is full of olive, mulberry, vines, apricot and lemon trees"

The town of Zgharta was divided into five sectors in 1932: Saydeh Sharki (the area to the east side of Notre-Dame of Zgharta church), Saydeh Gherbi (west of the Church), Slayeb Shemali (northern side of the crossroads), Slayeb Janoubi (southern side of the crossroads) and Maaser. To be a citizen of Zgharta, one is to be registered in one of these five sectors.

Accent
Wherever he goes, the Zghartaoui is instantly recognizable by his distinct accent. Among the well-informed and knowledgeable, the Zaghartoui dialect is rich in the Syriac spirit. Speakers of the Western Syriac language respect the Canaanite (Phoenician) origins, so the letter o 'prevails over that language.
Zgharta, whose general population did not speak Arabic until the end of the nineteenth century, transferred some of the Syriac terminology as well as signs of movement and incorporated them into the Arabic language that they now speak due to the necessity of communicating with the rest of the residents of Mount Lebanon and its coast and those who abandoned this language. At the beginning of the twentieth century, the Saint Joseph School in Zgharta attests to this and the other schools in Ehden, which taught the Syriac language in addition to the Arabic and French languages. The prayers and Masses were held in Syriac and Arabic, before they gradually disappeared even among those in charge of the Maronite Church, who lost the books of Maronite prayers and Masses from its Syriac language until it became restricted to schools and seminaries and theological institutes.
Residents of some villages in Mount Lebanon still speak Arabic with a Syriac accent, clinging to it and maintaining it because it is synonymous with their identity.

Climate
The climate is hot-summer Mediterranean (Csa in the Köppen climate classification), with very wet winters and very dry summers. About  of precipitation falls annually.

Notable people
 

 Youssef Barakat
 Youssef Bey Karam
 Youssef Salim Karam
 Salim Bey Karam
 Marie al-Khazen
 Jean Obeid

See also

 Ehden
 Ehden massacre

References

External links
Zgharta Ehden Municipality
 Youssef Bey Karam Foundation
 Ehden Family Tree
 Zgharta On Google Maps Street View By Paul Saad

Populated places in the North Governorate
Zgharta District
Maronite Christian communities in Lebanon